The A529 road is a non-primary road in England that runs from the A41 at Hinstock in Shropshire to the A530 in Nantwich, Cheshire.

Roads in England
Roads in Cheshire